Omri Ben Harush (or Ben Harosh, ; born 7 March 1990) is an Israeli professional footballer who plays as a right back defender for Bnei Sakhnin and for the Israeli national team.

Early life
Ben-Harush was born in Netanya, Israel, to a family of Sephardic Jewish descent.

Club career

Maccabi Netanya
Ben Harush joined Maccabi Netanya youth team when he was eight years old. He made his debut for the club on 3 August 2009 against Beitar Jerusalem.

In four seasons with Netanya he managed to play 125 games, score six goals and also provided three assists in all club competitions.

Maccabi Tel Aviv
On 11 July 2013, after four years in the senior side of Netanya, he moved to Maccabi Tel Aviv for a fee of $558,000. Omri signed a three-year contract with Tel Aviv. He made his debut for the club on 30 July 2013 in an away Champions League match against Basel. Ben Harush started the season well, after giving a chance in the first team line-up due to an injury of Maccabi's original left-back, Mané. He was lined-up in the historic 3–0 away win in Kiryat Eliezer Stadium against Maccabi Haifa on the third matchday of the Israeli Premier League, after Maccabi had failed to win there for more than nine years. His performances for Maccabi at the start of the season granted him a newly call for the national team, and he was lined-up in the away match against Portugal on 11 October 2013. He scored his debut goal for the club during the away match on 23 November 2013, against Hapoel Haifa.

International career

Ben Harush made his debut for the national team against Greece on 2 September 2011 in the Euro 2012 Qualifiers. He later took part in the World cup 2014 qualification away match against Portugal on 11 October 2013.

Career statistics

Club

Honours
Maccabi Tel Aviv
 Israeli Premier League: 2013–14, 2014–15
 Israel State Cup: 2014-2015 
 Toto Cup: 2014-2015

References

External links
 
 

1990 births
Living people
Israeli footballers
Israeli Sephardi Jews
Association football defenders
Maccabi Netanya F.C. players
Maccabi Tel Aviv F.C. players
Maccabi Haifa F.C. players
K.S.C. Lokeren Oost-Vlaanderen players
F.C. Ashdod players
Bnei Sakhnin F.C. players
Footballers from Netanya
Israeli Premier League players
Belgian Pro League players
Israel international footballers
Israel under-21 international footballers
Israel youth international footballers
Israeli expatriate footballers
Expatriate footballers in Belgium
Israeli expatriate sportspeople in Belgium
Israeli Mizrahi Jews
Israeli people of Moroccan-Jewish descent